Kayanza FC is a professional football club based in Kayanza City, Burundi.
 
The team currently plays in the Burundi Ligue A, the top division of Burundi football.

History 
The club was founded on March 31, 2014. In the 2016/17 season, they reached the round of 16 of the national cup for the first time and in the following season, they also won first place in Ligue B, which allowed them to get promoted to the top-class, Ligue A  for the first time. 
They managed to stay up in the league with 34 points and 12th place. The best placement was in the 2020/21 season, when they had 55 points but lost on goal difference to Le Massager, who also had 55 points and became champions.

Current team

Management and staff

Honors 
National competitions
Burundi Premier League::
 Runner-up: 2020–2021
Burundi Cup: 
 Finalist:

Achievements 
 Ligue B: 2017/18 Champions

Season placement

References

External links
Soccerway

Football clubs in Burundi